Barak Marshall is an American-born Israeli choreographer and singer.

Biography
Barak Marshall was born in the United States.  In 1994, after studying social theory and philosophy at Harvard University, he immigrated to Israel, where he began a successful career as a choreographer and singer. He was the house choreographer for the Batsheva Dance Company from 1999-2001.  As a singer he has performed with numerous ensembles including a guest performance with Yo-Yo Ma and the Silk Road Project.

Awards
 Suzanne Dellal’s 1995 Shades of Dance Choreography Competition: First prize, for Aunt Leah.  The work was also added to the repertoire of the Inbal Dance Theater.
 The 1998 Bagnolet International Competition awards: First Prize for Emma Goldman’s Wedding.  The piece also won him the Prix d’Auteur Award, the Bonnie Byrd Award for New Choreography and the National ADAMI Award.
 The 2009 Creative Capital (New York) for Symphony of Tin Cans, with Margalit Oved and Tamir Muskat of Balkan Beat Box.
 The 2010 Lester Horton Award
 First Prize,  the Joyce Foundation 2010 A.W.A.R.D. Show

References

External links
 About Barak Marshall
 Press praises for Barak Marshall's work
 Barak Marshall on Dance In Israel online magazine.
 Interview with Barak Marshall: Dancing between Israel and America (Podcast) (Part 1)
 Barak Marshall’s “Rooster” A review of Marshall's piece on Dance In Israel.
 Archive film of Barak Marshall's Monger in 2010 at Jacob's Pillow
 Archival footage of Barak Marshall in PillowTalk: 21st Century Renaissance Man at Jacob's Pillow
Archival footage Barak Marshall's of And at midnight the green bride floated through the village square in 2013 at Jacob’s Pillow Dance Festival.

American male dancers
American choreographers
Harvard University alumni
American emigrants to Israel
Living people
Year of birth missing (living people)